The Illawarra Grammar School, abbreviated as TIGS, is an independent Anglican comprehensive co-educational early learning, primary and secondary day school, located at Mangerton in the Illawarra region of New South Wales, Australia. The school caters for approximately 1,000 students from early learning to Year 12. TIGS offers an early learning programme for students between 3 and 5 years of age called TIGS Prep (previously titled, The Piper Centre). The School employs 97 teaching staff and 48 non-teaching staff. A total enrolment of 777 students consists of 406 boys and 371 girls as of 2019.

History
The Illawarra Grammar School was founded in 1958 by Bishop Gordon Begbie and dedicated parents. On its opening day, 3 February 1958, the first headmaster, Rev. Richard Bosanquet and two staff, welcomed 28 students into the school. In 1975, the school became co-educational when it amalgamated with SCEGGS 'Gleniffer Brae'. In 2009 TIGS celebrated the Golden Jubilee of its founding.

In 2012, TIGS became an International Baccalaureate World School, implementing the Primary Years Program (PYP).  At the end of 2018, TIGS announced the appointment of the eighth Head of School, Judith Nealy as the successor for long-serving Headmaster, Stephen Kinsella.

Notable alumni
Meganne Christian (2004) - member of the 2022 European Space Agency Astronaut Group
Robert Hurley (2006) - member of the Australian swimming team
 David McKeon (2010) - competed in the 2012 London Olympic Games for the Australian swimming team
 Emma McKeon (2012) - won four gold medals from the 2020 Summer Olympics
 Jarrod Poort (2012) - competed in the 2012 Summer Olympics in London and 2016 Summer Olympics in Rio for the Australian swimming team.

See also

 List of Anglican schools in New South Wales
 List of schools in Illawarra and the South East (New South Wales)
 Anglican education in Australia

References

External links
Illawarra Grammar School website

Anglican primary schools in New South Wales
Anglican secondary schools in New South Wales
Educational institutions established in 1959
Junior School Heads Association of Australia Member Schools
Schools in Wollongong
1959 establishments in Australia
Grammar schools in Australia